Juan Manuel Ley López  (February 17, 1933 – January 22, 2016)  was a Mexican businessman, and the Casa Ley chairman. He also was president of the baseball teams Saraperos de Saltillo in the Mexican Summer League and Tomateros de Culiacán in the Mexican Winter League.

In 1910, Ley's father, Lee Fong, left Guangdong province, China by boat. When he arrived in Sinaloa city, he "Mexicanized" his name to Juan Ley Fong instead. Ley himself was born and raised in Mexico.  The eldest of eight brothers and sisters, Juan Manuel was the CEO of Culiacán Sinaloa Mexico's Based Grupo Ley until his death, which comprises several companies going from Casa Ley SA de CV, one of Mexico's largest retail supermarkets (co-owned by California-based Safeway Inc.), Apparel Stores, Baseball Teams in both Mexican Leagues (Saraperos de Saltillo and Tomateros de Culiacán), Automobile Dealerships, and Del Campo y Asociados, one of the largest producers of fresh tomatoes for export into the United States.

He was born February 17, 1933, in Tayoltita, Durango, Mexico and died January 22, 2016, at 82 years old in Culiacan, Sinaloa, Mexico. He was elected to the Mexican Professional Baseball Hall of Fame in 2006.

References

Mexican Baseball Hall of Fame inductees
Mexican businesspeople
Mexican people of Chinese descent
Safeway Inc.
People from Culiacán
1933 births
2016 deaths